Donald Dougald Taylor (2 March 1923 – 5 December 1980) was a New Zealand cricketer who played in 3 Tests from 1947 to 1956. His nickname was "Bloke", because of his frequent use of the word.

Cricket career
A middle-order batsman, Taylor made his first-class debut in 1946–47, when he scored 205 runs at 51.25 to help Auckland win the Plunket Shield. In their last match of the season Auckland needed 236 to beat Canterbury and were 76 for 4 when Taylor came to the wicket. He scored 98 not out in an unbroken match-winning partnership of 161 with Bert Sutcliffe.

Later that season he made 12 batting at number five in his first Test, against England. He was recalled nine years later in 1955–56 against the West Indies after making 254 runs at 36.28 that season in the Plunket Shield. Batting at number four in the Third Test he made 43 and 77, top-scoring for New Zealand, and he was retained for the Fourth Test, which was New Zealand's first Test victory; Taylor made 11 and 16.

He played for Auckland from 1946–47 to 1948–49, then as a professional for Warwickshire from 1950 to 1953, without establishing himself in the county side, then returned to New Zealand to play for Auckland from 1953–54 to 1960–61.

Batting for Auckland against Canterbury in 1948-49 he and his partner Bert Sutcliffe achieved a world record by taking part in two opening partnerships of over 200 runs in the one match – 220 and 286. His 143 in the second innings of this match was his only first-class century.

See also
 List of Auckland representative cricketers

References

External links
 Don Taylor at Cricket Archive
 Don Taylor at Cricinfo

1923 births
1980 deaths
New Zealand Test cricketers
New Zealand cricketers
Auckland cricketers
Warwickshire cricketers
North Island cricketers